Caernarvon Township is the name of some places in the U.S. state of Pennsylvania:
Caernarvon Township, Berks County, Pennsylvania
Caernarvon Township, Lancaster County, Pennsylvania

Pennsylvania township disambiguation pages